Z. indica may refer to:

 Zanonia indica, a genus of liana
 Zeurrora indica, a species of miller moth

See also
 Indica (disambiguation)